Making It is a 1971 comedy-drama film directed by John Erman and written by Peter Bart and James Leigh. It stars Kristoffer Tabori, Bob Balaban, Lawrence Pressman, Joyce Van Patten, Marlyn Mason, and a number of character actors familiar to TV audiences of the 1970s. Adapted from Leigh's 1965 novel What Can You Do?, the film follows several months in the life of an intelligent, precocious 17-year-old high school student who fancies himself a smooth Lothario.

Plot
Phil Fuller (Tabori) is a 17-year-old high school student who lives in a small apartment with his young single mother. He assumes a facade of cynicism and tells his English teacher (Pressman) that he considers himself "smarter that 99% of the people". Seduction is his hobby. He beds the neglected wife of the high school basketball coach (Mason) by feigning being a sexually pent up virgin. Phil seduces a virginal classmate (Sherry Miles) by inviting her for a swim. Instead of a swim though, he pretends to make dinner for the two of them and spikes her food with pot. He even picks up a college girl by slapping on a fake mustache and hanging around the college bookstore.

Phil seems to sail through life not taking his actions seriously until the repercussions of his actions begin to hit home. First, the classmate he deflowered tells him that she might be pregnant. While the girl wants to get married, Phil convinces her mother (Louise Latham), who also tried to seduce him, that her daughter should get an abortion instead. Next, he finds out that the gym teacher's wife, who has a phobia about growing old, told her husband about the affair after Phil dumps her. Then the coach defends his wife's honor by strong-arming Phil into a deserted weight room and kneeing him in the crotch.

After arranging an illegal abortion for his pregnant girlfriend, he finds out that she is not pregnant but his mother is. Since her fiancé has been killed in an auto accident, she decides to get an abortion. Phil uses the money he had gotten for his girlfriend and brings his mother to the doctor instead. The doctor assumes that Phil is responsible for the pregnancy. Full of scorn and wanting to teach Phil a lesson, he forces Phil to assist in the abortion. On the drive home afterward, Phil's mother sees that this episode has rendered him less cocky and more mature and responsible.

Cast

 Paul Appleby as Ray 
 Carol Arthur as Mrs. Warren 
 Bob Balaban as Wilkie 
 David Doyle as Fanning 
 John Fiedler as Ames 
 Pamela Hensley as Bargirl 
 Casey King as Cafeteria Cashier 
 Louise Latham as Mrs. Wilson 
 Marlyn Mason as Yvonne 
 Doro Merande as Librarian 
 Sherry Miles as Debbie 
 Denny Miller as Skeeter 
 Lawrence Pressman as Mallory 
 Maxine Stuart as Miss Schneider 
 Kristoffer Tabori as Phil Fuller 
 Tom Troupe as Dr. Shurtleff
 Dick Van Patten as Warren
 Joyce Van Patten as Betty Fuller

Music
The film score was composed by Charles Fox who composed hits such as "Killing Me Softly with His Song" and "I've Got a Name" as well as the theme songs for Love, American Style; Happy Days; and Laverne and Shirley. The film featured two songs, "Morning Song" and "The All American" with music by Fox and lyrics by his frequent collaborator, Norman Gimbel.

Reception
In the Chicago Sun-Times, film critic Roger Ebert wrote:Making It is a curiously unfinished movie. It has all these serious things to tell us about youth, age, the generation gap and growing up in upper-middle-class America. It sneaks up and whispers them in our ear. And just when we're nodding in agreement, the movie gets embarrassed and changes the subject, and we're watching a cheap comedy situation or a sight gag. Like the adolescent it's about, Making It has an inadequate attention span.

See also
 List of American films of 1971

References

External links 
 
 

1971 films
1971 comedy-drama films
1971 directorial debut films
1970s coming-of-age comedy-drama films
1970s pregnancy films
20th Century Fox films
American coming-of-age comedy-drama films
Films about abortion
Films based on American novels
Films directed by John Erman
Films scored by Charles Fox
Films set in New Mexico
Films shot in New Mexico
Juvenile sexuality in films
1970s English-language films
1970s American films